Eureka High School, located in Eureka, Missouri, is a secondary school in the Rockwood School District. Eureka High School was the first high school in what would become the Rockwood School District. The high school opened in 1908 and was fully accredited within four years.

Student body
Eureka has a co-educational student body of 1,678 in the 2018–19 school year. More than half of the students come from LaSalle Springs Middle School, with a large portion of the rest coming from Wildwood Middle School. The racial makeup of the school is 87.7% white, 6.0% black, and 1.9% Hispanic.

Alumni
Maurice Alexander, NFL player for the Los Angeles Rams, Seattle Seahawks, and Buffalo Bills.
Cam Janssen, professional hockey player for the New Jersey Devils and the St. Louis Blues.
Bob Klinger, Major League Baseball pitcher with the Pittsburgh Pirates and Boston Red Sox
Clayton Echard, undrafted rookie for the Seattle Seahawks and star of season 26 of The Bachelor.
Rissi Palmer, country music artist
Hassan Haskins, Tennessee Titans running back.
Darnell Terrell, University of Missouri football star and undrafted rookie for the Cleveland Browns
Ricky Montgomery, singer, musician and songwriter

References

External links
Official website 

Educational institutions established in 1908
High schools in St. Louis County, Missouri
Public high schools in Missouri
1908 establishments in Missouri